Metaplagia is a genus of bristle flies in the family Tachinidae.

Species
Metaplagia brevicornis Brooks, 1945
Metaplagia cordata (Reinhard, 1959)
Metaplagia facialis (Reinhard, 1956)
Metaplagia latifrons (Reinhard, 1956)
Metaplagia occidentalis Coquillett, 1895
Metaplagia orientalis (Townsend, 1915)

References

Diptera of North America
Dexiinae
Tachinidae genera
Taxa named by Daniel William Coquillett